The RS500 is a double handed trapeze skiff designed by Phil Morrison, manufactured and designed by RS Sailing. The class has a PY number of 972. There are two sail size options (the S and XL rig) and makes the RS500 suitable for youngsters and adults. With ISAF Recognised Status, the RS500 has a racing circuit with events in UK, Europe and World Championships.

Performance and design
The cockpit is uncluttered and the low transom design makes climbing aboard after capsize easy and a pivoting centreboard and rudder make launch and recovery safe.

International success and awards
The RS500 is a Recognised ISAF class
The RS500 has won the 'Sailboat of the Year' Award twice

Events

World Championships

The World championships had participants from 15 countries. 

Medal Table

EuroCup-Serie

In 2017 the first EuroCup-Serie was held.

References

External links
 RS Sailing (Global HQ
 ISAF Connect to Sailing
 International RS Classes Association
 UK RS Association
 Italian RS500 Class Association
 German RS Class Association
 Dutch RS500 Class
 Plachetnice RS500 - Asociace lodních tříd RS - moderní jachting a plachetnice RS v Čechách a na Slovensku

Classes of World Sailing
Dinghies
Boats designed by Phil Morrison
Sailboat types built by RS Sailing